The politics of Madeira, Portugal, takes place in the framework of a semi-presidential representative democracy and of a pluriform multi-party system. The Representative of the Republic exercises some reserve powers on behalf of the President of the Portuguese Republic. Executive power is exercised by the Regional Government. Legislative power is vested in the Legislative Assembly. All government's offices are headquartered in Funchal, Madeira's capital city.

History 
In the years immediately after the Carnation Revolution in 1974, a small clandestine far-right independence movement – the Madeira Archipelago Liberation Front – was created in response to the perceived communist threat in the country's central government and carried out several bomb attacks.

The current Portuguese Constitution, in force since 25 April 1976, granted political and administrative autonomy to the Madeiran and the Azorian archipelagoes and turned the local government throughout the country democratically elected. The first election for the Regional Assembly were held in that year. Jaime Ornelas Camacho was the first President of the Regional Government.

Since the archipelago gained political autonomy from mainland Portugal in 1976, the centre-right Social Democratic Party (PSD) has always been in power, winning 11 absolute majorities in a row over 43 years, and until recently it had always ruled most municipalities. From 1978 to 2015, Alberto João Jardim was the sole President of the Regional Government, winning a total of 9 elections. In 2015, former Mayor of Funchal Miguel Albuquerque succeeded him. In 2019, for the first time since 1976, the PSD lost its parliamentary majority and was forced into a governmental coalition with the right-wing Popular Party.

Over the more than forty years of autonomy, a few Catholic priests stood out as some of the main political opposition figures against Alberto João Jardim's long-lasting rule, winning seats in parliament and municipalities for far-left (Communist Party and Popular Democratic Union) and centre-left parties (Socialist Party) and gathering disapproval from the Church local authorities.

Reserve powers

Legislative branch

Executive branch

Local government 
Madeira is divided in 11 municípios (municipalities), with each of these being split into freguesias (civil parishes), which add up to a total of 54.

Municipalities

Parishes 
Parishes with more than 10,000 inhabitants

Political parties and leaders

Opinion polling

See also 
 Politics of Portugal

References 

Politics of Madeira